Jose Luis Martin Cosgayon Gascon (26 May 1964 – 9 October 2021), also known as Chito Gascon, was a Filipino lawyer, civil organizer, and human-rights activist. In 2015, he was appointed by then President Benigno S. Aquino III as the Chair of the Commission on Human Rights of the Philippines serving a term from 2015 to 2021.

He served as member of the Human Rights Victims' Claims Board, where he held a rank equivalent to Justice of the Court of Appeals.

He was the youngest member of both the 1987 Constitutional Commission that help draft the Constitution of the Philippines. As a member of the Philippine House of Representatives representing the youth sector, he spearheaded the passage of pertinent legislation for the creation of the Sanggunian Kabataan and Republic Act 7610, a special law providing protection to children from abuse.

Career

Student Leader and Activist 
Gascon fought the Marcos dictatorship as a student leader. In the wake of the assassination of Senator Ninoy Aquino on 21 August 1983, he helped mobilize protest actions in schools demanding justice for all and radical political change. In 1985, he was elected Chair of the University of the Philippines Student Council in 1985 and led the youth movement that actively participated in the Non-Violent People Power Revolution in February 1986. He organized Human Rights Awareness Fairs in campuses and was an active member of Amnesty International Philippine Section at which he served for many years as a board member. He also actively campaigned for the release of Political Prisoners and visited detention centers with Lingap Bilanggo. He was a member of Liberal International's Human Rights Committee & was also alternate member in the Inter-Agency Committee on Extra-Judicial Killings and Enforced Disappearances established under AO 35. He was in the Official Delegation for the 2012 Universal Periodic Review at the Human Rights Council in Geneva that was led by Justice Secretary and former CHR Chair Leila De Lima.

Organizations 
He has been involved in many different civil society political alliances working for human rights and democracy such as the Kongreso ng Mamamayang Pilipino (KOMPIL 1 & 2), Bansang Nagkaisa sa Diwa at Layunin (BANDILA), the Black & White Movement, Social Liberals & Democrats for the Advancement of Reforms (SoLiDAR), and Re:Publika@DemokraXXIa - a new network of progressive activists. He was previously the executive director to both the liberal think tank National Institute for Policy Studies (NIPS) from 1987 to 2002 and LIBERTAS - a lawyers' network on the Rule of Law from 2005 to 2008. He was founding trustee and corporate counsel of the International Center for Innovation, Transformation, and Excellence in Governance (InciteGov) - the policy group of the so-called "Hyatt 10," and was part of its Advisory Group. He was Founding Trustee of the Institute for Leadership, Empowerment, and Democracy (iLEAD) and was in the organizing committee of the Asian Democracy Network (ADN).  He was Director General of the Liberal Party from 2008 to 2011 and was Political Director of its successful 2010 National Electoral Campaign. He has taught law, Politics, & Human Rights at the Political Science Departments at both the Ateneo de Manila and De la Salle Universities. He was also a Fellow at the Robredo Institute of Governance (RSIG).

Youngest member of the Constitutional Commission 
In the transition to democracy, during the term of President Corazon C. Aquino, he served as the youngest member of both the Constitutional Commission that drafted the 1987 Constitution and the 8th Philippine Congress, passing legislation that institutionalized youth participation in local government (Sangguniang Kabataan) as well as a special law providing for special protection of children from all forms of abuse (RA 7610). He has held several senior positions in government, such as separate stints as Undersecretary at the Department of Education (DepEd, from 2002 to 2005) & the Office of the President (Political Affairs, from 2011 to 2014). He was also a board member of the Bases Conversion Development Authority (BCDA) from 2010 to 2011.

He served as Panel Member at Peace Negotiations with the National Democratic Front (NDF) from 2001 to 2004 and had served as the chair from 2010 to 2014 of the Government's Human Rights Monitoring Committee (GPhMC) of that peace process within the framework of the Comprehensive Agreement on Respect for Human Rights and International Humanitarian Law (CARHRIHL). He has also assisted in peace negotiations involving the conflict with Muslim rebels in Mindanao as a member of the Technical Working Group on Power Sharing and Alternate Panel Member in peace talks with the Moro Islamic Liberation Front (MILF), and with the Ad Hoc High-Level Working Group for the Tripartite Review of the 1996 Final Peace Agreement with the Moro National Liberation Front (MNLF) together with the Organization of Islamic Cooperation's Peace Committee for Southern Philippines.

Awards and recognition 
His continuing reform advocacies were in the areas of human rights, access to justice and the rule of law, transparency and accountability initiatives, political and electoral reforms, peace and conflict transformation, people's participation and civic education, and state building in the context of democratic transitions. Among the fellowships and recognitions he has received are:

 Benigno S. Aquino Fellowship for Public Service given by the US State Department's Embassy in the Philippines in 2001 
 first Filipino recipient of both the Democracy and Development Fellowship at Stanford University's Center on Democracy, Development and the Rule of Law in 2005; and Reagan–Fascell Democracy Fellowship at the International Forum for Democratic Studies of the National Endowment for Democracy in 2006
 Asian Public Intellectual Fellowship given by the Nippon Foundation in 2007 
 Asian Leadership Fellowship given by the Japan Foundation in 2008

As chair of the Commission on Human Rights

On 18 June 2015, Gascon was appointed by President Benigno S. Aquino III as the new Chair of the Human Rights Commission of the Philippines for the 2015–2022 term. Gascon succeeded Etta Rosales who retired on 5 May 2015. Executive Director Marc Cabreros served as officer-in-charge of the commission after Rosales' resignation until Gascon's appointment.

Education and personal life
He graduated Bachelor of Arts in Philosophy from the University of the Philippines, Diliman as well as a Bachelor of Laws degree. He earned a Master of Law degree (specializing in Human Rights, Law of Peace, and Settlement of International Disputes) from St. Edmund's College, University of Cambridge.

He attended the 1997 Summer Institute on Human Rights administered by the International Institute for Human Rights with the European Human Rights Mechanisms in Strasbourg, France. He has also attended specialized seminars at the Theodor Heuss Academy for Freedom in Gummersbach, Germany and with the Center for Democratic Initiatives at the Australian National University in Canberra, Australia.

He was married to Melissa P. Mercado and had a daughter, Ciara Sophia.

Death
On 9 October 2021, his brother Miguel revealed in a Facebook post that Chito had died from COVID-19.

See also 
Philippine Constitutional Commission of 1986
Sanggunian Kabataan
Commission on Human Rights (Philippines)

References

Bibliography
 

1964 births
2021 deaths
People from Manila
Deaths from the COVID-19 pandemic in the Philippines
20th-century Filipino lawyers
Filipino human rights activists
Filipino people of Spanish descent
Filipino Roman Catholics
Alumni of St Edmund's College, Cambridge
Arroyo administration personnel
Benigno Aquino III administration personnel
Chairpersons of the Commission on Human Rights of the Philippines
Duterte administration personnel
Liberal Party (Philippines) politicians
Sectoral members of the House of Representatives of the Philippines
University of the Philippines Diliman alumni
21st-century Filipino lawyers
Members of the Philippine Constitutional Commission of 1986